Krtina is a village in the Municipality of Domžale in the Upper Carniola region of Slovenia.

The settlement used to be part of the Krumperk lordship. The local church is dedicated to Saint Leonard.

References

External links

Krtina on Geopedia

Populated places in the Municipality of Domžale